The Thomas Covered Bridge is a historic wooden covered bridge located at Armstrong Township in Indiana County, Pennsylvania. It crosses Crooked Creek. It is one of four remaining covered bridge in Indiana County. Originally built by the Martindale family of Presque Island peninsula, also credited with constructing the famous Presque Island Lighthouse in Erie, PA

It was listed on the National Register of Historic Places in 1979.

References

External links

Covered bridges on the National Register of Historic Places in Pennsylvania
Covered bridges in Indiana County, Pennsylvania
Bridges completed in 1879
Wooden bridges in Pennsylvania
Bridges in Indiana County, Pennsylvania
National Register of Historic Places in Indiana County, Pennsylvania
Road bridges on the National Register of Historic Places in Pennsylvania
Lattice truss bridges in the United States
1879 establishments in Pennsylvania